Razdolny (masculine), Razdolnaya (feminine), or Razdolnoye (neuter) is the name of several rural localities in Russia.

Modern localities

Altai Krai
As of 2014, four rural localities in Altai Krai bear this name:

Razdolny, Kamensky District, Altai Krai, a settlement in Poperechensky Selsoviet of Kamensky District; 
Razdolny, Smolensky District, Altai Krai, a settlement in Kirovsky Selsoviet of Smolensky District; 
Razdolnoye, Loktevsky District, Altai Krai, a selo in Zolotukhinsky Selsoviet of Loktevsky District; 
Razdolnoye, Rodinsky District, Altai Krai, a selo in Razdolnensky Selsoviet of Rodinsky District;

Amur Oblast
As of 2014, three rural localities in Amur Oblast bear this name:

Razdolnoye, Mazanovsky District, Amur Oblast, a selo in Novokiyevsky Rural Settlement of Mazanovsky District; 
Razdolnoye, Shimanovsky District, Amur Oblast, a selo in Malinovsky Rural Settlement of Shimanovsky District; 
Razdolnoye, Tambovsky District, Amur Oblast, a selo in Razdolnensky Rural Settlement of Tambovsky District;

Astrakhan Oblast
As of 2014, one rural locality in Astrakhan Oblast bears this name:

Razdolny, Astrakhan Oblast, a settlement in Kamennoyarsky Selsoviet of Chernoyarsky District;

Chuvash Republic
As of 2014, one rural locality in the Chuvash Republic bears this name:

Razdolnoye, Chuvash Republic, a selo in Syresinskoye Rural Settlement of Poretsky District;

Republic of Crimea
As of 2014, two inhabited localities in the Republic of Crimea bear this name:
Urban localities
Razdolnoye, Razdolnensky District, Republic of Crimea, an urban-type settlement in Razdolnensky District

Rural localities
Razdolnoye, Sovetsky District, Republic of Crimea, a selo in Sovetsky District

Jewish Autonomous Oblast
As of 2014, one rural locality in the Jewish Autonomous Oblast bears this name:
Razdolnoye, Jewish Autonomous Oblast, a selo in Birobidzhansky District

Kaliningrad Oblast
As of 2014, four rural localities in Kaliningrad Oblast bear this name:
Razdolnoye, Bagrationovsky District, Kaliningrad Oblast, a settlement in Pogranichny Rural Okrug of Bagrationovsky District
Razdolnoye, Nesterovsky District, Kaliningrad Oblast, a settlement in Prigorodny Rural Okrug of Nesterovsky District
Razdolnoye, Pravdinsky District, Kaliningrad Oblast, a settlement in Domnovsky Rural Okrug of Pravdinsky District
Razdolnoye, Slavsky District, Kaliningrad Oblast, a settlement in Yasnovsky Rural Okrug of Slavsky District

Republic of Kalmykia
As of 2014, one rural locality in the Republic of Kalmykia bears this name:

Razdolny, Republic of Kalmykia, a settlement in Achinerovskaya Rural Administration of Chernozemelsky District;

Kamchatka Krai
As of 2014, one rural locality in Kamchatka Krai bears this name:
Razdolny, Kamchatka Krai, a settlement in Yelizovsky District

Kemerovo Oblast
As of 2014, two rural localities in Kemerovo Oblast bear this name:

Razdolny, Kemerovo Oblast, a settlement in Razdolnaya Rural Territory of Guryevsky District; 
Razdolnoye, Kemerovo Oblast, a selo in Kalininskaya Rural Territory of Mariinsky District;

Krasnodar Krai
As of 2014, seven rural localities in Krasnodar Krai bear this name:

Razdolny, Bryukhovetsky District, Krasnodar Krai, a settlement in Chepiginsky Rural Okrug of Bryukhovetsky District; 
Razdolny, Kanevskoy District, Krasnodar Krai, a khutor in Novoderevyankovsky Rural Okrug of Kanevskoy District; 
Razdolny, Korenovsky District, Krasnodar Krai, a settlement in Novoberezansky Rural Okrug of Korenovsky District; 
Razdolny, Novokubansky District, Krasnodar Krai, a khutor in Sovetsky Rural Okrug of Novokubansky District; 
Razdolnoye, Sochi, Krasnodar Krai, a selo in Razdolsky Rural Okrug under the administrative jurisdiction of Khostinsky City District under the administrative jurisdiction of the City of Sochi; 
Razdolnoye, Kushchyovsky District, Krasnodar Krai, a selo in Razdolnensky Rural Okrug of Kushchyovsky District; 
Razdolnaya, Krasnodar Krai, a stanitsa in Razdolnensky Rural Okrug of Korenovsky District;

Krasnoyarsk Krai
As of 2014, one rural locality in Krasnoyarsk Krai bears this name:
Razdolnoye, Krasnoyarsk Krai, a settlement in Razdolnensky Selsoviet of Bolshemurtinsky District

Kurgan Oblast
As of 2014, one rural locality in Kurgan Oblast bears this name:

Razdolnaya, Kurgan Oblast, a village in Krasnouralsky Selsoviet of Yurgamyshsky District;

Republic of North Ossetia-Alania
As of 2014, one rural locality in the Republic of North Ossetia-Alania bears this name:

Razdolnoye, Republic of North Ossetia-Alania, a selo in Razdolnensky Rural Okrug of Mozdoksky District;

Novgorod Oblast
As of 2014, one rural locality in Novgorod Oblast bears this name:
Razdolnoye, Novgorod Oblast, a village in Moiseyevskoye Settlement of Maryovsky District

Novosibirsk Oblast
As of 2014, two rural localities in Novosibirsk Oblast bear this name:

Razdolny, Novosibirsk Oblast, a settlement in Iskitimsky District; 
Razdolnoye, Novosibirsk Oblast, a selo in Novosibirsky District;

Omsk Oblast
As of 2014, one rural locality in Omsk Oblast bears this name:

Razdolnoye, Omsk Oblast, a village in Yuzhny Rural Okrug of Pavlogradsky District;

Orenburg Oblast
As of 2014, one rural locality in Orenburg Oblast bears this name:
Razdolnoye, Orenburg Oblast, a selo in Studenovsky Selsoviet of Ileksky District

Primorsky Krai
As of 2014, one rural locality in Primorsky Krai bears this name:
, a settlement in Nadezhdinsky District

Pskov Oblast
As of 2014, one rural locality in Pskov Oblast bears this name:
Razdolny, Pskov Oblast, a village in Pskovsky District

Rostov Oblast
As of 2014, one rural locality in Rostov Oblast bears this name:

Razdolny, Rostov Oblast, a khutor in Kiyevskoye Rural Settlement of Remontnensky District;

Ryazan Oblast
As of 2014, one rural locality in Ryazan Oblast bears this name:
Razdolnoye, Ryazan Oblast, a selo in Zhmurovsky Rural Okrug of Mikhaylovsky District

Sakhalin Oblast
As of 2014, three rural localities in Sakhalin Oblast bear this name:
Razdolnoye, Korsakovsky District, Sakhalin Oblast, a selo in Korsakovsky District
Razdolnoye, Nevelsky District, Sakhalin Oblast, a selo in Nevelsky District
Razdolnoye, Smirnykhovsky District, Sakhalin Oblast, a selo in Smirnykhovsky District

Saratov Oblast
As of 2014, two rural localities in Saratov Oblast bear this name:
Razdolnoye, Krasnopartizansky District, Saratov Oblast, a selo in Krasnopartizansky District
Razdolnoye, Lysogorsky District, Saratov Oblast, a settlement in Lysogorsky District

Stavropol Krai
As of 2014, two rural localities in Stavropol Krai bear this name:
Razdolny, Stavropol Krai, a khutor in Georgiyevsky Selsoviet of Kochubeyevsky District
Razdolnoye, Stavropol Krai, a selo in Razdolnensky Selsoviet of Novoalexandrovsky District

Sverdlovsk Oblast
As of 2014, one rural locality in Sverdlovsk Oblast bears this name:
Razdolnoye, Sverdlovsk Oblast, a selo in Zarechensky Selsoviet of Kamyshlovsky District

Volgograd Oblast
As of 2014, two rural localities in Volgograd Oblast bear this name:
Razdolny, Volgograd Oblast, a settlement in Basakinsky Selsoviet of Chernyshkovsky District
Razdolnoye, Volgograd Oblast, a selo in Sovkhozsky Selsoviet of Nikolayevsky District

Vologda Oblast
As of 2014, one rural locality in Vologda Oblast bears this name:
Razdolnaya, Vologda Oblast, a village in Sukhonsky Selsoviet of Mezhdurechensky District

Voronezh Oblast
As of 2014, two rural localities in Voronezh Oblast bear this name:
Razdolny, Voronezh Oblast, a khutor in Nikolskoye Rural Settlement of Bobrovsky District
Razdolnoye, Voronezh Oblast, a village in Novotroitskoye Rural Settlement of Ternovsky District

Zabaykalsky Krai
As of 2014, one rural locality in Zabaykalsky Krai bears this name:
Razdolnoye, Zabaykalsky Krai, a settlement at the station in Mogochinsky District

Abolished localities
Razdolny, Troitsky District, Altai Krai, a settlement in Gordeyevsky Selsoviet of Troitsky District in Altai Krai; abolished in October 2012;

Alternative names
Razdolny, alternative name of Razdolnoye, a selo in Zolotukhinsky Selsoviet of Loktevsky District in Altai Krai; 
Razdolny (or Razdolnoye), alternative name of Razdolnoye, a selo in Razdolnensky Selsoviet of Rodinsky District in Altai Krai; 
Razdolny (or Razdolnaya), alternative name of Razdolnoye, a selo in Malinovsky Rural Settlement of Shimanovsky District in Amur Oblast; 
Razdolny (or Razdolnoye), alternative name of Tatal, a settlement in Tatalskaya Rural Administration of Yustinsky District in the Republic of Kalmykia; 
Razdolny, alternative name of Razdolnoye, a selo in Kalininskaya Rural Territory of Mariinsky District in Kemerovo Oblast; 
Razdolnoye, alternative name of Razdolny, a settlement in Poperechensky Selsoviet of Kamensky District in Altai Krai;

Notes